The 2010–11 Oregon Ducks men's basketball team represented the University of Oregon during the 2010–11 NCAA Division I men's basketball season. The Ducks, led by first year head coach Dana Altman, played the first part of their home games at McArthur Court until the completion of their new stadium, Matthew Knight Arena, in January. They are members of the Pacific-10 Conference. They finished the season 21–18, 7–11 in Pac-10 play and lost in the semifinals of the 2011 Pacific-10 Conference men's basketball tournament to Washington. They were invited to and were champions of the 2011 College Basketball Invitational, defeating Creighton in the best-of-three games finals 2–1. The Ducks were the second team from the Pac-10 to enter the CBI with a losing record and win the tournament (Oregon State, 2009).

Roster

Schedule
 
|-
!colspan=9 style=| Exhibition

|-
!colspan=9 style=| Regular season

|-
!colspan=6 style=| Pac-10 tournament

|-
!colspan=9 style=| CBI

References

Oregon Ducks
Oregon Ducks men's basketball seasons
Oregon Ducks
College Basketball Invitational championship seasons
Oregon
Oregon